The Congressional Wildlife Refuge Caucus (CWRC) is a large bi-partisan Congressional Member Organization in the U.S. House of Representatives formed to support the National Wildlife Refuge System through legislation, funding, and education.

History

The Congressional Wildlife Refuge Caucus was established in September 2006 by Congressmen Ron Kind (D-WI) and Jim Saxton (R-NJ) along with vice co-chairs Michael Castle (R-DE) and Mike Thompson (D-CA) with a call to manage the National Wildlife Refuge System in the tradition of President Theodore Roosevelt, who established the first National Wildlife Refuge in 1903 . The formation of the CWRC was largely a response to budget shortfalls that resulted in multi-billion dollar maintenance backlogs and staff shortages that, many agreed, was preventing the Refuge System from fulfilling its basic mission.

Guiding Principles

Mission
The mission of the Congressional Wildlife Refuge Caucus is to fortify, protect and preserve the National Wildlife Refuge System by supporting adequate Refuge funding, working for the strategic growth of the Refuge System through easements and targeted land acquisition and by promoting legislation to improve the Refuge System.  The CWRC also aims to educate members of Congress about the increasing number of challenges facing the System through briefings and other forms of outreach.

Purpose
The purpose of the CWRC is to:

 Raise awareness of our refuge system
 Create a voice for refuges in Congress
 Support adequate Refuge System budgets
 Support the six priority activities outlined in the National Wildlife Refuge System Improvement Act (hunting, fishing, wildlife photography, wildlife observation, environmental education and interpretation)
 Supporting the strategic growth of the Refuge System

Caucus Activity

Legislation
The Congressional Wildlife Refuge Caucus co-chairs have introduced the Refuge Ecology Protection, Assistance & Immediate Response (REPAIR) Act, a bill aimed at reducing harmful non-native (invasive) species on land in and adjacent to National Wildlife Refuges.  The REPAIR Act is intended to provide a cost-effective approach to maximize invasive species eradication efforts by establishing a grant program and codifying in law the highly successful Volunteer Invasives Monitoring Program (VIMP).

House Action
The Caucus also submits letters to federal appropriators and administration officials calling for specific dollar amounts in Refuge System appropriations that help drive the Refuge funding discussion in Congress.  The co-chairs also author op-ed pieces magazines and newspapers to educate the public on the challenges facing the Refuge System.  Caucus members also play an active role in committee hearings concerning the National Wildlife Refuge System, primarily in the House Natural Resources Committee, to collect testimony from managers and experts on legislation concerning the Refuge System.

Members

Leadership
The CWRC is currently led by Rep. Rob Wittman (R-VA), Rep. Ron Kind (D-WI), Rep. Frank LoBiondo (R-NJ), and Rep. Mike Thompson (D-CA). Past co-chairs include Rep. Ed Perlmutter (D-CO) and Rep. Michael Castle (R-DE).

The CWRC launched with 100 founding members and had grown to 139 members representing 41 States and 182 Wildlife Refuges as of November, 2009 .

Current and Former Congressional Wildlife Refuge Members
(in alphabetical order)

External links
 Cooperative Alliance for Refuge Enhancement (CARE)
 National Wildlife Refuge System
 National Wildlife Refuge Association

Caucuses of the United States Congress
National Wildlife Refuges of the United States